Jagat Khera is a village in Bighapur block of Unnao district, Uttar Pradesh, India. As of 2011, its population is 646, in 125 households, and it has no schools and no healthcare facilities.

The 1961 census recorded Jagat Khera as comprising 1 hamlet, with a total population of 318 (179 male and 147 female), in 230 households and 208 physical houses. The area of the village was given as 215 acres.

References

Villages in Unnao district